Klimo may refer to:

 "Klimo", a fictional eccentric detective in A Prince of Swindlers by Guy Boothby
 Károly Klimó (born 1936), Hungarian artist
 György Klimó (1710–1777), bishop of Pécs, founder of press and public library